R&J Records is an American independent record label specializing in country music. It was founded in May 2011 by James Stroud and Rick Carter. Stroud is a record producer and former president of Giant Records and DreamWorks Records. In 2008, Stroud launched Stroudavarious Records and signed many artists to that label. Most Stroudavarious artists' contracts were moved to the new label, whereas some other previous artists signed with Stroudavarious have moved to other record labels.

Stroudavarious Records

Stroud had founded in July 2008 Stroudavarious Records The label's roster consisted of new artists and artists who had signed to major labels. It had many artists signed to Stroudavarious, including Aaron Lewis, LoCash Cowboys, Shelly Fairchild, Shea Fisher, Houston County, Blaine Larsen (Treehouse), Richie McDonald, Anthony Smith and Darryl Worley. BamaJam included Tracy Lawrence, Blackberry Smoke and Matt Kennon. Country Crossing included John Anderson, Aaron Tippin, Louise Mandrell, Lee Greenwood and Lorrie Morgan. Emrose signed Margaret Durante.

R&J/DMP/Emrose
James Stroud announced on May 17, 2011 the launching of the Nashville-based R&J Records. The same executive team that ran Stroudavarious Records ran the new label. Besides R&J Records, there were two concurrent labels: DMP Records and Emrose Records.

R&J was "restructured" in April 2012, with Andy Gibson transferring to Curb Records and Maggie Rose (formerly known as Margaret Durante) moving to RPM Entertainment.

Roster
R&J Records
Alexa Carter
Heartland
Aaron Lewis 
LoCash Cowboys

DMP Records
Andy Gibson 
Rob Lane

Emrose Records
Margaret Durante

References

External links
Official website

American country music record labels
Record labels established in 2008
Record labels established in 2011
American independent record labels